Nandom is the capital town of the Nandom Municipal of the Upper West Region of Ghana.

Nandom town and the multiple villages that surround it to the north, south, east, and west are inhabited by Dagara  people. The Dagara of the Nandom municipal and the Dagaaba to the south of Nandom are the same ethnic group, though they speak two different dialects of the same language. The people of Nandom speak the Lobr dialect, and the Dagaaba to the south speak Ngmere (or Central Dàgááre). People in Nandom use the label 'Dagara' for the language and the people and southern speakers us the label 'Dagaaba' for the people and Dagaare for the language. These are, however, different pronunciations of the same language rather than names of the two dialects, as many people have taken them to be. The two dialects of the language are mutually intelligible.

Nandom used to be part of the Lawra-Nandom District. It became a district by itself in 2012 and in 2020 it became a municipal, called the Nandom Municipal, with a parliamentary representative in the Parliament of Ghana in the capital city of Accra. There is a road running west of Nandom to the River Volta ending at the village of Dabagteng.  north of Nandom is a town called Hamile where there is a formal border between Ghana and Burkina Faso with customs and immigration offices. Many of the towns and villages across the border in southern Burkina Faso also speak the same dialect as the Dagara of Nandom. Other dialects such as Wiile and Ule are, also spoken in Burkina Faso.

The Catholic Basilica in Nandom is built of stone and used to be the largest Christian church in West Africa. Christian missionary activities in the area were introduced by the Catholic Missionaries of Africa (also called the White Fathers) in the 1930s. The Catholic church was built of stone through labour provided by the native people themselves.

In  the middle of the town resides most of the members of the Muslim community. The majority of Muslims are from other parts of Ghana or neighboring Burkina Faso. Most of them are Mossi people from Burkina Faso who settled in the town several decades ago.

Nandom is the home of Nandom Senior High School, a Catholic school established by the FIC Brothers. The town is also home to the Nandom Technical School, also established by the FIC Brothers. St. Anne's Vocational School for girls was established by the Catholic church. There are also elementary schools: St. Andrew School, and St. Paul School. Most of the villages in the area have their own primary and/or middle schools.

References

Populated places in the Upper West Region